Loudmouth – The Best of Bob Geldof and the Boomtown Rats is a 1994 greatest hits compilation album from Bob Geldof and the Boomtown Rats, consisting mostly of Boomtown Rats material but also some of Geldof's solo work. It peaked at No. 10 in the UK Albums Chart in July 1994.

"Crazy" was a previously unreleased Geldof track, and was released in the UK as a single from this album.

In 1997, the album was released by Columbia Records in the US as Great Songs of Indifference - The Best of Bob Geldof & the Boomtown Rats, with exactly the same track list, except "Crazy" was omitted.

Track listing
All songs were written by Bob Geldof, except where noted.
 "I Don't Like Mondays" (1979) – 4:17 from The Fine Art of Surfacing
 "This Is the World Calling" (1986) (Raymond Doom, Geldof) – 4:23 from Deep in the Heart of Nowhere
 "Rat Trap" (1978) – 4:51 from A Tonic for the Troops
 "The Great Song of Indifference" (1990) – 4:35 from The Vegetarians of Love
 "Love or Something" (1990) (Geldof, David A. Stewart) – 4:32 from The Vegetarians of Love
 "Banana Republic" (1980) (Pete Briquette, Geldof) – 3:29 from Mondo Bongo
 "Crazy" (1994) (Doom, Geldof, Olle Romo) – 4:29 Previously unreleased
 "The Elephant's Graveyard" (1981) – 3:42 from Mondo Bongo
 "Someone's Looking at You" (1980) – 4:22 from The Fine Art of Surfacing
 "She's So Modern" (1978) (Johnny Fingers, Geldof) – 2:56 from A Tonic for the Troops
 "House on Fire" (1982) – 4:46 from V Deep
 "The Beat of the Night" (1986) – 5:06 from Deep in the Heart of Nowhere
 "Diamond Smiles" (1979) – 3:49 from The Fine Art of Surfacing
 "Like Clockwork" (1978) (Briquette, Simon Crowe, Geldof) – 3:38 from A Tonic for the Troops
 "Room 19 (Sha La La La Lee)" (1992) – 3:41 from The Happy Club
 "Mary of the 4th Form" (1977) – 3:30 from ''The Boomtown Rats
 "Lookin' After No. 1" (1977) – 3:08 from The Boomtown Rats 

Tracks 1, 3, 6, 8, 9, 10, 11, 13, 14, 16, 17 - The Boomtown Rats
Tracks 2, 4, 5, 7, 12, 15 - Bob Geldof

Singles
 "Crazy"  / "Room 19 (Sha La La La Lee)" (Live) / "The Beat Of The Night" (Live) / "Rat Trap" (Live) (May 1994) (UK release)
 "Crazy"  / "Mary Of The 4th Form" (Live) / "Looking After Number One" (Live) / "Joey's On The Street" (Live) (May 1994) (UK Limited edition release)
 "Crazy" / "Looking After Number 1" (Live) / "The Beat Of The Night" (Live) / "Room 19 (Sha La La La Lee)" (Live) (1994) (European release)

References

The Boomtown Rats albums
1994 greatest hits albums